Ostertagia is a genus of nematodes belonging to the family Trichostrongylidae.

The genus has cosmopolitan distribution.

Species:
Ostertagia antipini 
Ostertagia arctica 
Ostertagia buriatica 
Ostertagia dahurica 
Ostertagia drozdzi 
Ostertagia gruehneri 
Ostertagia kolchida 
Ostertagia lasensis 
Ostertagia leptospicularis 
Ostertagia lyrataeformis 
Ostertagia mossi 
Ostertagia murmani 
Ostertagia nemorhaedi 
Ostertagia orloffi 
Ostertagia ostertagi 
Ostertagia skrjabini 
Ostertagia trifurcata 
Ostertagia volgaensis

References

Nematodes